Kwon Young-woo (also Kwon Yeong-u, ; born May 4, 1981 in Seoul) is a South Korean judoka, who competed in the men's middleweight category. He captured two golds in the 81-kg division at the Summer Universiade (2001 and 2003), completed a full set of medals at the Asian Judo Championships, and later finished seventh at the 2004 Summer Olympics.

Kwon emerged as a frontrunner and a medal contender at the 2001 Summer Universiade in Beijing, China, where he took home the gold in the 81-kg class against Azerbaijan's Mehman Azizov. Two years later, Kwon defeated Spain's Óscar Fernández for an unprecedented second straight gold in his respective division.

Kwon qualified for the South Korean squad in the men's half-middleweight class (81 kg) at the 2004 Summer Olympics in Athens, by placing third and receiving a berth from the Asian Championships in Almaty, Kazakhstan. He thwarted France's Cédric Claverie and Cuba's Gabriel Arteaga in the prelims by a waza-ari and a yuko score, before being sanctioned with a penalty and falling short to Greek judoka and eventual Olympic champion Ilias Iliadis in a sudden-death quarterfinal match. In the repechage round, Kwon ran off from his temporary falter with an effortless victory over Australia's Morgan Endicott-Davies, but fell short in a tremendous ippon to Brazilian judoka Flávio Canto within twenty-seven seconds, ending him in the seventh spot.

References

External links
 

1981 births
Living people
Olympic judoka of South Korea
Judoka at the 2004 Summer Olympics
Judoka at the 2006 Asian Games
Sportspeople from Seoul
South Korean male judoka
Universiade medalists in judo
Universiade gold medalists for South Korea
Asian Games competitors for South Korea
21st-century South Korean people